This is a list of colleges and universities in Tennessee. This list also includes other educational institutions providing higher education.

Institutions

Colleges and universities

Defunct Colleges and Universities

Tennessee Board of Regents

Two-year institutions 
Chattanooga State Community College, Chattanooga
Cleveland State Community College, Cleveland
Columbia State Community College, Columbia
Dyersburg State Community College, Dyersburg
Jackson State Community College, Jackson
Motlow State Community College, Lynchburg
Nashville State Community College, Nashville
Northeast State Community College, Blountville
Pellissippi State Community College, Knoxville
Roane State Community College, Harriman
Southwest Tennessee Community College, Memphis
Volunteer State Community College, Gallatin
Walters State Community College, Morristown

Colleges of Applied Technology 
 Tennessee College of Applied Technology - Athens
 Tennessee College of Applied Technology - Chattanooga, Chattanooga
 Tennessee College of Applied Technology - Covington
 Tennessee College of Applied Technology - Crossville
 Tennessee College of Applied Technology - Crump, Crump
 Tennessee College of Applied Technology -Dickson 
 Tennessee College of Applied Technology - Elizabethton
 Tennessee College of Applied Technology - Harriman
 Tennessee College of Applied Technology - Hartsville
 Tennessee College of Applied Technology - Hohenwald
 Tennessee College of Applied Technology - Jacksboro
 Tennessee College of Applied Technology - Jackson
 Tennessee College of Applied Technology - Knoxville
 Tennessee College of Applied Technology - Livingston
 Tennessee College of Applied Technology - McKenzie
 Tennessee College of Applied Technology - McMinnville
 Tennessee College of Applied Technology - Memphis
 Tennessee College of Applied Technology - Morristown, Morristown
 Tennessee College of Applied Technology - Murfreesboro
 Tennessee College of Applied Technology - Nashville
 Tennessee College of Applied Technology - Newbern, Newbern
 Tennessee College of Applied Technology - Oneida
 Tennessee College of Applied Technology - Paris
 Tennessee College of Applied Technology - Pulaski, Pulaski
 Tennessee College of Applied Technology - Ripley
 Tennessee College of Applied Technology - Shelbyville, Shelbyville
 Tennessee College of Applied Technology - Whiteville

Private institutions

Two-year institutions 
John A. Gupton College, Nashville
National College of Business & Technology, Memphis
Remington College
Nashville
Memphis
Daymar Institute
Clarksville
Murfreesboro
Nashville
Miller-Motte Technical College
Clarksville

See also

 Higher education in the United States
 List of college athletic programs in Tennessee
 List of American institutions of higher education
 List of recognized higher education accreditation organizations
List of colleges and universities
List of colleges and universities by country

Notes

References

External links
U.S. Department of Education listing of accredited institutions in Tennessee

 
Tennessee, List of colleges and universities in
Colleges and universities